Jean Knight Bain (1909–1999) was a state legislator in Colorado from Denver. A Republican, she served in the Colorado House of Representatives from 1961 to 1972.

She was born Elizabeth Jean Knight. She graduated from East High School in Denver and the University of Colorado.

In 1959, her occupation was listed as housewife. In 1963 she was one of six women serving in the Colorado House. History Colorado has a collection of her papers.

References

1909 births
20th-century American politicians
1999 deaths
Politicians from Denver
Colorado Republicans
Women state legislators in Colorado
20th-century American women politicians
University of Colorado alumni